James Wignall (21 July 1856 – 10 June 1925) was a British Labour Party politician. He sat in the House of Commons for seven years from 1918 to 1925.

In 1893 Wignall was appointed Secretary of the Swansea branches of the Dockers' Union and between 1905 and 1908 he was President of the union.

Wignall was first elected at the 1918 general election as the Member of Parliament (MP) for the Forest of Dean division of Gloucestershire, defeating the sitting Liberal Party MP Sir Henry Webb, Bt. He was re-elected three times, in 1922, 1923 and 1924, and held the seat until his death in June 1925, aged 68. At the resulting by-election on 14 July, the seat was retained for Labour by Albert Arthur Purcell.

Wignall was the father of Trevor Wignall the sportswriter and author.

On 10 June 1925, Wignall collapsed in the corridors of the House of Commons and was taken to hospital, where he died the same day aged 58.

References

External links 
 

1856 births
1925 deaths
Labour Party (UK) MPs for English constituencies
Transport and General Workers' Union-sponsored MPs
UK MPs 1918–1922
UK MPs 1922–1923
UK MPs 1923–1924
UK MPs 1924–1929